Yota is a Russian mobile broadband services provider and smartphone manufacturer.

Yota or YOTA may also refer to:

 Yōta, a masculine Japanese given name
 Yorta Yorta language, also spelled Yota, an extinct language once spoken by the Yorta Yorta people of Australia
 Year of the Artist, a nationwide scheme organised by the ten English Regional Arts Boards to fund residencies by artists
 A slang for a Toyota

See also
 Jota (food), a stew popular in the northern Adriatic region
 Yotta-, one of the largest unit prefix in the International System of Units